Norbert Staudt (9 June 1907 – 18 December 1989) was a Luxembourgian water polo player. He competed in the men's tournament at the 1928 Summer Olympics.

References

1907 births
1989 deaths
Luxembourgian male water polo players
Olympic water polo players of Luxembourg
Water polo players at the 1928 Summer Olympics
Sportspeople from Luxembourg City